Mohamed Amine Zidane (born 5 October 1983 in Relizane) is an Algerian footballer. He currently plays for RC Relizane in the Algerian Ligue Professionnelle 2.

References

1983 births
Living people
People from Relizane
Algerian footballers
Association football defenders
RC Relizane players
MC Oran players
USM Alger players
USM Annaba players
USM Blida players
ASM Oran players
Algerian Ligue Professionnelle 1 players
Algerian Ligue 2 players
21st-century Algerian people